John Houston McIntosh (February 1, 1879 – July 14, 1925) was an American college football player and coach, as well as an attorney and newspaper editor. He was the head coach of the Colorado State (1904–05) and Montana State (1908–10) football programs. McIntosh was a star athlete at the University of Georgia in the late 1890s, and later moved west to coach football.

Early years
John H. McIntosh was born on February 1, 1879, in Early County, Georgia, a son of Dr. B. L. McIntosh.

University of Georgia
McIntosh graduated from the University of Georgia with a Doctor of Law in 1899. He was captain of the track team, a fullback on the football team, and played right field on the baseball team.

Move west
McIntosh moved west to New Mexico and continued his practice as a lawyer. After one season at the Colorado School of Mines, McIntosh became the first athletic director at Colorado State. He was then athletic director and professor of English at Montana State College.

McIntosh died at Seattle, Washington, in 1925.  He is buried at the Wright Crematory and Columbarium  in Seattle.

Head coaching record

Legacy and honors
The World War II Liberty Ship  was named in his honor.

References

1879 births
1925 deaths
19th-century players of American football
American football fullbacks
Baseball outfielders
Basketball coaches from Georgia (U.S. state)
Colorado Mines Orediggers football coaches
Colorado State Rams athletic directors
Colorado State Rams football coaches
Georgia Bulldogs baseball players
Georgia Bulldogs football players
Georgia Bulldogs track and field athletes
Montana State Bobcats football coaches
Montana State Bobcats men's basketball coaches
People from Early County, Georgia
Players of American football from Georgia (U.S. state)
Baseball players from Georgia (U.S. state)
Track and field athletes from Georgia (U.S. state)